was a  after Gennin and before Kangi. This period spanned the years from December 1227 to March 1229.

Change of era
 1227 :  The era name was changed to mark an event or a number of events. The previous era ended and a new one commenced in Karoku 3.

Events of the Antei Era
 1227 (Antei 1, 1st month): Fujiwara Kintsugu died at age 53. He had been Udaijin and Sadaijin.
 1227 (Antei 1, 2nd month): The emperor raised Fujiwara no Nagako, the daughter of Konoe Iezane, to the rank of chūgū (empress consort). She was somewhat older than the emperor, but he became deeply attached to her.

Notes

References
 Nussbaum, Louis-Frédéric and Käthe Roth. (2005).  Japan encyclopedia. Cambridge: Harvard University Press. ;  OCLC 58053128
 Titsingh, Isaac. (1834). Nihon Odai Ichiran; ou,  Annales des empereurs du Japon.  Paris: Royal Asiatic Society, Oriental Translation Fund of Great Britain and Ireland. OCLC 5850691
 Varley, H. Paul. (1980). A Chronicle of Gods and Sovereigns: Jinnō Shōtōki of Kitabatake Chikafusa. New York: Columbia University Press. ;  OCLC 6042764

External links
 National Diet Library, "The Japanese Calendar" -- historical overview plus illustrative images from library's collection

Japanese eras
1220s in Japan